Eternity: The Movie is a 2014 LGBT music dramedy film directed by Ian Thorpe and screenplay by Thorpe, Joey Abi-Loutfi and Eric E. Staley. The film stars Barrett Crake, Myko Olivier, Eric Roberts, Martin Kove, Jon Gries and Nikki Leonti.

Plot 
A moronic duo form a two man band in the 1980s.

Cast 

 Barrett Crake
 Myko Olivier
 Eric Roberts
 Martin Kove
 Jon Gries
 Nikki Leonti

Production 
Principal photography for the film took place in San Diego.

Release 
The film premiered at Cinequest Film & Creativity Festival. It was distributed by Indican Pictures.

Reception 
The film received mostly negative reviews. Review aggregator Rotten Tomatoes has a 0% approval rating and an average score of 2.3/10 based on six reviews.

The New York Times said it had "much more dead air than laughs." The Village Voice claims that "the jokes are slow and obvious." Los Angeles Times does state that the movie gets the wardrobe right for the 80s period it is set in. In a more favorable review, Screen Anarchy states they were surprised that the script was humorous.

References

External links 

 
 

2014 films
2010s American films
Films shot in San Diego
Films set in 1985
Films about music and musicians
Films set in Los Angeles
Blues films
LGBT-related buddy comedy-drama films
American buddy comedy-drama films
2010s buddy comedy films
2014 LGBT-related films